Durbin Sanders Feltman (born April 18, 1997) is an American professional baseball pitcher in the Boston Red Sox organization. He played college baseball for the TCU Horned Frogs.

Amateur career
Feltman attended and graduated from Oak Ridge High School in Conroe, Texas, alongside Luken Baker. In high school, he was a catcher, and only began pitching prior to his senior year. He was not drafted out of high school in the 2015 Major League Baseball draft and he enrolled at Texas Christian University (TCU) to play college baseball for the TCU Horned Frogs baseball team.

In 2016, as a freshman at TCU, Feltman was tied for first in the Big 12 Conference with nine saves. In  innings pitched in relief, he struck out 49 and compiled a 3–0 record and 1.56 earned run average (ERA). He was named to the All-Big 12 Freshman Team. As a sophomore in 2017, he made 29 relief appearances, going 2–2 with a 3.64 ERA with a TCU record 17 saves. He played in the Cape Cod Baseball League for the Falmouth Commodores that summer. As a junior in 2018, Feltman posted a 0.74 ERA and six saves with 43 strikeouts in  innings pitched. He missed nearly a month during the season due to injury. He was named to the All-Big 12 First Team.

Professional career
Feltman was considered one of the top prospects for the 2018 Major League Baseball draft. He was selected in the third round, with the 100th overall pick, by the Boston Red Sox. Feltman signed with the Red Sox on June 14. He was assigned to the Class A Short Season Lowell Spinners, and made his professional debut on June 29. He made four appearances with Lowell, not allowing a hit or walk in four innings, while striking out seven. On July 10, Feltman was promoted to the Class A Greenville Drive, where he made seven one-inning appearances, compiling a 2.57 ERA while striking out 14 and walking one. On August 1, Feltman was promoted to the Class A-Advanced Salem Red Sox, where he finished the season. In  relief innings pitched, he posted a 2.19 ERA and struck out 15 batters.

Feltman spent 2019 with the Portland Sea Dogs of the Class AA Eastern League, going 2–3 with a 5.26 ERA over 43 relief appearances, striking out 54 over  innings. After the 2020 minor league season was cancelled due to the COVID-19 pandemic, Feltman was invited to participate in the Red Sox' fall instructional league. To begin the 2021 season, he returned to Portland (now members of the Double-A Northeast), and was promoted to the Worcester Red Sox of the Triple-A East in late July. Over 39 relief appearances between the two clubs, Feltman went 8–1 with a 2.96 ERA and 62 strikeouts over  innings. He was named Boston's minor-league reliever of the year. He returned to Worcester for the 2022 season. Over forty relief appearances, he went 3-5 with a 7.63 ERA, 24 walks, and 56 strikeouts over  innings.

References

Further reading

External links

SoxProspects.com
D1Baseball.com
TCU Horned Frogs bio 

1997 births
Living people
Baseball players from Texas
People from Conroe, Texas
Baseball pitchers
TCU Horned Frogs baseball players
Falmouth Commodores players
Lowell Spinners players
Greenville Drive players
Salem Red Sox players
Portland Sea Dogs players
Worcester Red Sox players